Gil de Siloé (Antwerp? 1440s – Burgos, 1501) was a Castilian sculptor of Flemish origin, who worked in Burgos in a late gothic or Isabelline style.

His Hispano-Flemish style, which combines influences of the Germanic and Flemish gothic, and Mudéjar, is meticulous in its ornamentation and displays great technical virtuosity.

He was the father of an important architect and sculptor, Diego de Siloe.

Works
In Miraflores Charterhouse there are several works by Gil de Siloé:
The main altarpiece (1496–1499). Gil was assisted by Diego de la Cruz, who was responsible for the polychromy and some of the figures.
The mausoleum of King John II of Castile and of his wife, Isabella of Portugal (1489–1493).
The funeral monument for Alfonso son of John II and brother of Isabella I of Castile (1489–1492).

For Burgos Cathedral:
Altarpiece of the chapel of Saint Anne (1486–1492). 
Retable of Saint Anne in the Chapel of the Condestable (c. 1498).

Other works:
Funeral monument for Don Juan de Padilla for the Monastery of Fresdeval, actually in the Museum of Burgos (c. 1500).
Enthroned Virgin and Christ Child in alabaster, Cleveland Museum of Art, Cleveland, Ohio, US.

Attribution
Many attributions are debated by art historians if are by his hand, by members of his workshop or by followers. Among them the most outstanding are:
The façade of the San Gregorio College in Valladolid.
The doors between the transept and the cloister of Burgos Cathedral.

Sources

 

Spanish sculptors
Spanish male sculptors
Gothic sculptors
1501 deaths
Year of birth unknown